The Bill Duthie Booksellers' Choice Award is a literary prize awarded annually by the BC Book Prizes for the "best book in terms of public appeal, initiative, design, production and content." The prize is shared by the author and publisher. To qualify, the publisher must be located in British Columbia or the Yukon and in full creative control (editing, design and production). The winner, unlike the other prizes which are determined by judges, is selected by ballot sent to bookstores across the province of British Columbia.

History
The award is named in honour of BC bookseller Bill Duthie who founded Duthie Books in 1957. It was first awarded in 1985 and was one of the original four prizes awarded by the BC Book Prizes. The prize used to be called "BC Booksellers' Choice Award in Honour of Bill Duthie" but the name was simplified in 2010 to align with the other BC Book Prizes.

Winners and finalists

References

External links
 Bill Duthie Booksellers' Choice Award, official website

BC and Yukon Book Prizes
1985 establishments in British Columbia
Awards established in 1985